was a Japanese professional shogi player who achieved the rank of 9-dan.

Promotion history
The promotion history for Ariyoshi is as follows:
1951: 3-kyū
1953: 1-dan
1955, May 15: 4-dan
1957, April 1: 5-Dan
1958, April 1: 6-dan
1960, April 1: 7-dan
1965, April 1: 8-dan
1979, April 1: 9-dan 
2010, May 24: Retired

Titles and other championships
Ariyoshi appeared in major title matches a total of nine times and won one major title. He won the 21st Kisei title in 1972 for his only major title. In addition to his one major title, Ariyoshi won eight other shogi championships during his career.

Death
Ariyoshi died on September 27, 2022, at age 87. He died while being hospitalized for aspiration pneumonia.

References

External links
ShogiHub: Professional Player Info· Michio Ariyoshi

1935 births
2022 deaths
Japanese shogi players
Deceased professional shogi players
Professional shogi players from Okayama Prefecture
Kisei (shogi)